Three Waiting Maids is a 1925 German silent comedy film directed by Carl Boese and starring Hanni Weisse, Maly Delschaft, and Bruno Kastner. It was remade in 1932 as Mrs. Lehmann's Daughters and the 1933 Swedish film Marriageable Daughters.

The film's sets were designed by the art director Robert A. Dietrich.

Cast
Hanni Weisse as Amelie, waiting maid
Maly Delschaft as Martha, waiting maid
Bruno Kastner as Hans Brandstetter
Margarete Kupfer as mother
Helga Molander as Annie, waiting maid
Jakob Tiedtke as Leopold Siedentopf
Hugo Fischer-Köppe as Franz, Brandstetter's chauffeur
Harry Halm as Emil Kummerbach, bartender
Hermann Picha as photographer

See also
 (1933)
 (1934)

References

External links

Films of the Weimar Republic
German silent feature films
German comedy films
Films directed by Carl Boese
1925 comedy films
Terra Film films
German black-and-white films
Silent comedy films
1920s German films